Ramón Cabrero Muñíz (Santander, Cantabria 7 November 1947 – 1 November 2017) was a Spanish - Argentine footballer. He was the manager of Atlético Nacional in Colombia until April 5, 2010. Cabrero is widely considered one of the greatest idols and a symbol of Lanús.

Cabrero was born in the Spanish city of Santander, but when he was 4 years old he moved to Argentina.

Playing career

Cabrero played 5 years with Lanús before joining Newell's Old Boys. He then played for three clubs in Spain; Atlético Madrid,  Elche CF and Mallorca. He returned to Argentina and played in Mendoza with Independiente Rivadavia and San Martín.

Managerial career

Cabrero's first success as a manager came when he led Deportivo Italiano into the Primera División Argentina by winning the Primera B Nacional in 1986. He then had spells in charge of Deportivo Maipú, Central Córdoba (SdE) and Colón de Santa Fe.

Cabrero then had several years as a youth team coach with Racing Club and Lanús.

Cabrero returned to first team management with Albanian side Dinamo Tirana in 2005 but was sacked for failing to reach the 2nd round of the Intertoto Cup. He then took over as coach of  Lanús in 2005.

In 2007 Cabrero led Lanús to their first ever top flight league championship; the Primera División Argentina Apertura 2007.

In May, 2009, Cabrero became manager of Atletico Nacional, from Medellin, Colombia.

Managerial titles

References

1947 births
2017 deaths
Spanish emigrants to Argentina
Spanish footballers
Argentine footballers
Footballers from Santander, Spain
Association football midfielders
Argentine Primera División players
Club Atlético Lanús footballers
Newell's Old Boys footballers
Independiente Rivadavia footballers
La Liga players
Atlético Madrid footballers
Elche CF players
RCD Mallorca players
Expatriate footballers in Argentina
Argentine football managers
Club Atlético Colón managers
Club Atlético Lanús managers
Atlético Nacional managers
FK Dinamo Tirana managers
Argentine expatriate football managers
Expatriate football managers in Albania
Argentine expatriate sportspeople in Albania